Andrés Rodríguez Erben is an Anglican Auxiliary Bishop of Paraguay.

References

Living people
Anglican bishops of Paraguay
21st-century Anglican bishops in South America
Year of birth missing (living people)
Place of birth missing (living people)